Neil Prosser (born 8 March 1957) is an English footballer, who played as a forward in the Football League for Tranmere Rovers.

References

Tranmere Rovers F.C. players
AFC Bournemouth players
English Football League players
Association football forwards
Harlow Town F.C. players
1957 births
Living people
People from Edmonton, London
English footballers